Mike Dragosavich (born May 10, 1985) is an American businessman and former American football punter. He was signed by the New England Patriots as an undrafted free agent in 2008. He played college football at North Dakota State.

Dragosavich has also been a member of the Cleveland Browns and Indianapolis Colts.

Early years and Personal
Dragosavich was born to Carol Kuracar and Pete Tomich in Oak Lawn, Illinois. He attended Harold L. Richards High School, where he was a first-time all-conference player in football, playing wide receiver and punter, as well as captaining the baseball team. Dagosavich gained internet fame during college when videos of him dancing at his alma-mater's basketball games were posted online.

College career
Dragosavich completed his senior year with the North Dakota State Bison football team in 2007. He led the FCS in average yards per punt. At the 2008 Senior Bowl, he averaged 58 yards per punt in three punts, including a record-breaking 69-yarder.

Awards and honors
 2008 Senior Bowl, Texas Vs. The Nation All-Star Challenge
 2007 College Sporting News FCS Fabulous 50 All-America team
 2007 All-Great West Football Conference first-team
 2007 The Sports Network FCS Special Teams Player of the Week
 2007 GWFC Special Teams Player of the Week
 2007 Street & Smith FCS Preseason All-America first-team
 2007 The Sports Network FCS Preseason All-America first-team
 2007 Lindy's FCS Preseason All-America first-team
 2006 The Sports Network FCS All-America second-team
 2006 Football Gazette FCS All-America second-team
 2006 Football Gazette All-Northwest Region first-team
 2006 All-Great West Football Conference first-team
 2005 Associated Press I-AA All-America second-team
 2005 Football Gazette I-AA All-America second-team
 2005 CollegeSportsReport.com All-Division I-AA first-team
 2005 Football Gazette All-Region first-team
 2005 All-GWFC first-team (media), second-team (coaches)
 2004 Honorable mention All-GWFC
 I-AA.org National Weekly All-Star
 Three-time Football Gazette Special Teams Player of the Week
 Three-time GWFC Special Teams Player of the Week

Professional career

New England Patriots
Dragosavich signed a contract with the New England Patriots after going undrafted in the 2008 NFL Draft but was released on June 5, 2008.

Cleveland Browns
Dragosavich was signed to the practice squad of the Cleveland Browns on December 26, 2008. He was re-signed to a future contract on December 30, only to be waived on February 9, 2009.

Indianapolis Colts
Dragosavich was claimed off waivers by the Indianapolis Colts on February 11, 2009. He was waived by the team on May 4.

Post-playing career
Following his time in the NFL, Dragosavich returned to Fargo, ND in 2010, where he founded a publishing company called Spotlight Media, focusing on printed magazines.

Dragosavich also opened a bar in Fargo, "Herd and Horns Bar and Grill".

References

External links
Cleveland Browns bio
Indianapolis Colts bio
New England Patriots bio
North Dakota State Bison bio

1985 births
Living people
People from Oak Lawn, Illinois
American football punters
North Dakota State Bison football players
New England Patriots players
Cleveland Browns players
Indianapolis Colts players